Up All Night or Up All Nite may refer to:

Film, television and radio
 Up All Night (film), or Friday Download: The Movie, a 2015 British film
 Up All Night (TV series), a 2011 American sitcom on NBC
 USA Up All Night, a 1989–1998 movie/variety show on the USA Network
 Up All Night (radio show), a UK news programme

Television episodes
 "Up All Night" (30 Rock), 2007
 "Up All Night" (The Adventures of Chuck and Friends), 2010
 "Up All Night" (The Angry Beavers), 1997
 "Up All Night" (The Bill), 1992
 "Up All Night" (Doctor Who), 2011
 "Up All Night" (Dream On), 1992
 "Up All Night" (Little Bear), 1995
 "Up All Night" (Mad About You), 1994
 "Up All Night" (Man Up!), 2011
 "Up All Night" (Modern Family), 2010
 "Up All Night" (My Gym Partner's a Monkey), 2006
 "Up All Night" (The Secret Life of the American Teenager), 2010
 "Up All Night" (Squirrel Boy), 2006
 "Up All Night" (Whitney), 2011

Music
 Up All Night Tour, a 2011–2012 concert tour by One Direction
 Up All Night: The Live Tour, a 2012 video documenting the tour
 Up All Nite Records, a record label founded by Too Short

Albums
 Up All Night (The Chic Organization album), 2013
 Up All Night (East 17 album), 1995
 Up All Night (John Scofield album), 2003
 Up All Night (Kip Moore album) or the title song, 2012
 Up All Night (One Direction album) or the title song, 2011
 Up All Night (Pajama Party album), 1989
 Up All Night (Razorlight album) or the title song, 2004
 Up All Night (Rob Mills album), 2004
 Up All Night (The Waifs album) or the title song, 2003
 Up All Night – Deric Ruttan Live or the title song (see below), 2011
 Up All Night, by the Procussions, 2004

Songs
 "Up All Night" (Alex Clare song), 2010
 "Up All Night" (Blink-182 song), 2011
 "Up All Night" (Beck song), 2017
 "Up All Night" (Drake song), 2010
 "Up All Night" (Jon Pardi song), 2013
 "Up All Night" (Khalid song), 2019
 "Up All Night" (Matt Willis song), 2006
 "Up All Night" (Slaughter song), 1990
 "Up All Night" (Take That song), 2009
 "Up All Night" (Unwritten Law song), 2001
 "Up All Night" (Young Knives song), 2008
 "Up All Night", by Best Coast from The Only Place, 2012
 "Up All Night", by the Boomtown Rats from V Deep, 1982
 "Up All Night", by Charlie Puth from Nine Track Mind, 2016
 "Up All Night", by Charlotte Martin from On Your Shore, 2004
 "Up All Night", by David Archuleta from Postcards in the Sky, 2017
 "Up All Night", by Deric Ruttan from Sunshine, 2010
 "Up All Night", by Hinder from Take It to the Limit, 2008
 "Up All Night", by iamnot, 2018
 "Up All Night", by Joe Walsh from Ordinary Average Guy, 1991
 "Up All Night", by Lionel Richie from Coming Home, 2006
 "Up All Night", by Rachel Crow, 2019
 "Up All Night", by the Records from Shades in Bed, 1979
 "Up All Night", by Rosemary's Sons, 2002
 "Up All Night", by Suburban Legends from Rump Shaker, 2003
 "Up All Night", by the War on Drugs from A Deeper Understanding, 2017
 "Up All Night", by Widespread Panic from Free Somehow, 2008
 "Up All Nite", by DJ Maj from BoogiRoot, 2005

Other uses
 Nuit debout, a 2016 French protest movement known in English as Up All Night
 Up All Night, a young-adult novel by Sarah Weeks
 Up All Night, a comic strip by Michael Kupperman